Hellcats (lit. "I Like It Hot" or "Some Like It Hot") is a 2008 South Korean romantic comedy film about an extended family of three women from different generations—the fortysomething interior designer Young-mi (Lee Mi-sook), the 27-year old screenwriter Ah-mi (Kim Min-hee), and the high school student Kang-ae (Ahn So-hee) -- who are all engaged in dilemmas regarding love and sex.

Plot
27-year-old Ah-mi is a freelance screenwriter, and she's on her 17th rewrite for a screenplay that has been in the works for over a year. For the past 3 years, she's been living with her older sister Young-mi because she can't afford rent on her own. Ah-mi dreams of success and independence, but these seem far-off. She has a boyfriend named Won-suk, a member of a struggling rock band, who is mostly broke. Then one day, she goes out on a blind date and a new guy, Seung-won, enters her life. Seung-won is a successful accountant, and is very different from Won-suk.

Meanwhile, 40-year-old Young-mi is a happy, independent single mother and interior designer. She begins working with a theatre company where she meets a much younger actor named Kyoung-soo, who takes a romantic interest in her. But even her sexy, confident self gets insecure when on her next doctor's visit, she learns that she's undergoing menopause.

There is also Young-mi's teenage daughter, Kang-ae. She is a bright, optimistic high school student, whose current goal in life is to figure out a way to get a kiss from her boyfriend of three years, Ho-jae. Kang-ae's best friend, Mi-ran, a self-proclaimed dating expert, coaches Kang-ae in matters of love. Mi-ran helps Kang-ae plan a strategy for her first kiss, but their scheme goes haywire, and Kang-ae's first kiss ends up being with Mi-ran.

Although different in age, attitude about life, and dating preferences, the three women each learn to find their own unique way to happiness.

Cast
 Lee Mi-sook as Kim Young-mi
 Kim Min-hee as Kim Ah-mi
 Ahn So-hee as Kimg Kang-ae
 Kim Sung-soo as Oh Seung-won
 Kim Heung-soo as Na Won-suk
 Yoon Hee-seok as Choi Kyung-soo
 Kang Hae-in as Yoo Mi-ran
 Kim Bum as Lee Ho-jae
 Jang Hang-jun as Director Ahn
 Park Kwang-jung as Gynecologist
 Jung In-gi as Cafe owner 
 Oh Yeon-ah as Woman in Na Won-suk's workshop 
 Lee Myeong-haeng as Travel agency friend 
 Kim Gyeong-hyeong as Customer 
 Moon Se-yoon as Ah-mi's hairstylist
 Jun-seong Kim as Young-mi's nail artist
 Lee Eun-sung as Kang-ae's cosmetics staff member

Awards and nominations

References

External links
  
 
 
 

2008 films
South Korean romantic comedy films
2000s South Korean films